Gulmi is a district in Nepal.

Gulmi may also refer to:

Places 

 Gaudakot, Gulmi, a village and municipality in Gulmi District.
 Rupakot Gulmi, a village in Gulmi District.
 Musikot, Gulmi, an urban municipality in Gulmi District.
 Gulmi Tamghas, a headquarter of Gulmi District.